Bongil Bongil National Park is a national park in New South Wales, Australia, 427 km northeast of Sydney.

Many migratory birds and animals have found refuge in the Bongil Bongil National Park, and the surrounding forests are home to one of the largest koala populations in NSW. About 165 species of birds have been recorded in the park.

See also 
 Protected areas of New South Wales
 List of reduplicated Australian place names

References 

National parks of New South Wales
Protected areas established in 1995
1995 establishments in Australia